In the Common Interest is a Canadian documentary television series which aired on CBC Television from 1955 to 1956.

Premise
Vincent Tovell, the United Nations correspondent for CBC, hosted this series featured the state of social development in various nations. The first season featured nations such as Ethiopia, Indonesia and Thailand. The second season included global development topics such as improvement in living standards, efforts to reduce malaria, and the work of the United Nations including UNICEF's activities to support women and their children in Asia. CBC produced In the Common Interest with support from the United Nations.

Scheduling
This 15-minute series was broadcast on various days and times from 6 February 1955 to 1 July 1956.

References

External links
 

CBC Television original programming
1950s Canadian documentary television series
1955 Canadian television series debuts
1956 Canadian television series endings
Black-and-white Canadian television shows